Jaroslav Machač (born 1926) is a former international speedway rider from Czechoslovakia.

Speedway career 
Machač reached the final of the Speedway World Team Cup in the 1960 Speedway World Team Cup. He was champion of Czechoslovakia in 1960 after winning the Czechoslovakian Championship and reached two European Longtrack Championship finals in 1960 and 1969.

World final appearances

World Team Cup
 1960 -  Göteborg, Ullevi (with František Richter / Luboš Tomíček Sr. / Antonín Kasper Sr. / Bohumír Bartoněk) - 3rd - 15pts (4)

Individual Ice Speedway World Championship
1969 -  Inzell, 7th - 8pts
1970 -  Nässjö, 10th - 6pts

References 

1926 births
Czech speedway riders
Living people